Kadhal Azhivathillai is a 2002 Indian Tamil-language romantic action film written, directed and produced by T. Rajendar, who also composed the music and portrayed a supporting role as Vakkeel Dada. It stars his son Silambarasan (his debut as a lead actor) and Charmi. The movie released on 4 November 2002. It got mixed reviews and was a box office failure.

Plot

Simbhu is elected college chairman after he beats Charmi, the daughter of Ravishankar, a minister. Predictably, the two soon fall for each other, though they never directly reveal it. But when Ravishankar learns of the love affair, he is staunchly against it and is willing to go any distance to make sure that it never succeeds. At Simbhu's house, his father mentally harasses his wife, since he suspects her of having an affair with her ex-lover. Outside the home, Simbhu is helped by Vakkeel Dada, a lawyer who makes sure justice is served, whatever the means.

Cast

Silambarasan as Simbhu
Charmy Kaur as Charmi
T. Rajendar as Vakkeel Dada (director)
Karunas as Sami
Radha Ravi as Union Minister Ravishankar
Nalini as Charmi's mother
Prakash Raj as Fingerprint Expert, Simbhu's father
Seetha as Simbhu's mother
Riyaz Khan  as Vasanth
Monica as Monica
Kuralarasan as Charmi's brother
Ajay Rathnam as Police Inspector
Santhanam as Simbhu's friend 
V.K.Ramaswamy as Old man in the opening scene

Production
T. Rajender announced that his son Silambarasan would play the lead role in Kadhal Azhivathillai in 2000. After failing to find a suitable lead actress to appear opposite Silambarasan, Rajender postponed the project and went on to make Sonnal Thaan Kaadhala (2001). Vadivelu's brother played a role in the film.

Soundtrack

The music was composed by Vijaya T. Rajendar along with the lyrics.

Reception
Chennai Online wrote "This rich guy-poor girl romance, set against a college campus backdrop is narrated in the director's expected, inimitable style". The Hindu wrote "The story line has nothing innovative to offer in terms of content". Sify wrote "This is the launch vehicle of Silambarasan the ?Little star? of yesterday who is touted as ?Little Superstar? by his father T. Rajendar who has produced and directed film Kathal Azhivathillai. The film has been made to showcase Silambarasan?s many talents (?). In spite of all this and loud boasting, the film is a slur on the audience thinking capability. Does T. Rajendar think that the audience are dumb and ignoramus?".

References

External links 
 

2000s romantic action films
2000s Tamil-language films
2002 films
Films directed by T. Rajendar
Films scored by T. Rajendar
Indian romantic action films
Films with screenplays by T. Rajendar